The ovarian branch of uterine artery is an artery anastomosing with the ovarian artery.

Arteries of the abdomen